Elfrīda Karlsone (18 April 1904 – 4 June 1983) was a Latvian athlete. She competed in the women's discus throw at the 1928 Summer Olympics.

References

1904 births
1983 deaths
Athletes (track and field) at the 1928 Summer Olympics
Latvian female discus throwers
Olympic athletes of Latvia
Place of birth missing